Honor Rising: Japan 2017 was a two-day professional wrestling "supershow" event co-produced by the Japanese New Japan Pro-Wrestling (NJPW) and American Ring of Honor (ROH) promotions. The shows took place on February 26 and 27, 2017, at Korakuen Hall in Tokyo, Japan.

Continuing the partnership between NJPW and ROH, these were the second annual Honor Rising: Japan shows co-produced by NJPW and ROH.

Production

Background
Honor Rising: Japan 2017 was officially announced by New Japan Pro-Wrestling (NJPW) on November 29, 2016. On February 3, 2017, NJPW announced the ROH wrestlers taking part in the events; ROH World Champion Adam Cole, ROH World Tag Team Champions The Young Bucks (Matt Jackson and Nick Jackson), The Briscoe Brothers (Jay Briscoe and Mark Briscoe), Dalton Castle, Delirious, Hangman Page, Jay Lethal, Punisher Martinez, Silas Young and War Machine (Hanson and Raymond Rowe). For Martinez and Young, the shows would mark their first NJPW appearances. Also announced for the events were Cody and Kenny Omega, the former making his first NJPW appearance since Wrestle Kingdom 11 in Tokyo Dome and the latter making his return to NJPW after a brief hiatus, which started on January 5, 2017. NJPW wrestlers announced for the tour included Bad Luck Fale, Juice Robinson, Tama Tonga, Tanga Loa and Will Ospreay.

Cards and the rest of the NJPW participants for the shows were released on February 13. The shows were set to feature three title matches. On the first show, Los Ingobernables de Japón (Bushi, Evil and Sanada) would defend the NEVER Openweight 6-Man Tag Team Championship against Delirious, Jyushin Thunder Liger and Tiger Mask. The second show would see Hirooki Goto defend the NEVER Openweight Championship against Punisher Martinez, while Adam Cole would defend the ROH World Championship against Yoshi-Hashi. The match between Cole and Yoshi-Hashi had been set up at an NJPW show on January 5, 2017, when Yoshi-Hashi pinned Cole in a six-man tag team match.

The shows would air worldwide through NJPW's internet streaming site, NJPW World, with English commentary provided by Kevin Kelly and Rocky Romero.

Results
February 26

February 27

Notes
In their coverage of the event, NJPW refers to Martinez as "Punisher Martinez", while ROH uses the name "Punishment Martinez".

References

External links
Honor Rising: Japan 2017 at NJPW.co.jp 

Honor Rising: Japan
2017 in professional wrestling
Events in Tokyo
Professional wrestling in Tokyo
2017 in Tokyo
February 2017 events in Japan